Karim Ben Hassan Aouadhi (Arabic: كريم العواضي; born 2 May 1986) is a Tunisian professional footballer who plays as a defensive midfielder. He made 11 appearances for the Tunisia national team scoring once.

Career
Born in Mégrine, Aouadhi was formed at AS Mégrine and joined in 2007 Club Africain.

On 5 September 2008, Aouadhi moved on loan to UAE League club Al-Wahda until June 2009 for 250 million dinars.

On 7 April 2011, he signed a two-year contract for German club Fortuna Düsseldorf, but the contract was terminated by both sides for reason of language problems on 27 December 2011.

After a short spell with CS Sfaxien, he joined Étoile du Sahel in July 2018.

Career statistics

Scores and results list Tunisia's goal tally first, score column indicates score after each Aouadhi goal.

Honours
Club Africain
Tunisian League: 2007–08

References

Living people
1986 births
Tunisian footballers
Association football midfielders
Tunisia international footballers
2019 Africa Cup of Nations players
Tunisian Ligue Professionnelle 1 players
2. Bundesliga players
UAE Pro League players
Saudi Professional League players
AS Mégrine players
Club Africain players
CS Sfaxien players
Stade Tunisien players
Al Wahda FC players
Fortuna Düsseldorf players
Espérance Sportive de Tunis players
Étoile Sportive du Sahel players
Abha Club players
Tunisian expatriate footballers
Expatriate footballers in the United Arab Emirates
Tunisian expatriate sportspeople in the United Arab Emirates
Expatriate footballers in Germany
Tunisian expatriate sportspeople in Germany
Expatriate footballers in Saudi Arabia
Tunisian expatriate sportspeople in Saudi Arabia
Tunisia A' international footballers
2016 African Nations Championship players